SS Lesbian was a cargo ship built for the Ellerman Lines in 1915. On 5 January 1917 she was shelled and sunk by German U-boat , the most successful U-boat participating in World War I, without loss of life.

Design and construction 
Lesbian was a built as a cargo ship for the Ellerman Lines by W. Harkess & Sons of Middlesbrough. Sources do not indicate when Lesbians keel was laid, but she was launched on 3 April 1915, and completed by July of the same year. Sources do not indicate what size crew she carried. Lesbian was defensively armed against attacks by submarines, but available sources provide no indication of what size or how many guns with which she was equipped.

Career 
Little information is available about Lesbians short career, but details about her final voyage suggest that she may have been employed in cargo service between India and the United Kingdom. For her final voyage, she departed Calicut—where she had taken on a general cargo bound for London and Tees—in December 1916. After passing through the Suez Canal, Lesbian entered the Mediterranean and headed towards Malta. While  from there on 5 January 1917, she encountered U-35, under the command of Kapitänleutnant Lothar von Arnauld de la Perière.

At 16:15 on 5 January 1917, U-35 shelled and sank Lesbian east of Malta at position . There he would wait until the crew had abandoned the ship in lifeboats and then shell the bow and stern of the ship until it sank. Von Arnauld de la Perière claimed that he always provided crews of his victims with directions to the nearest port, but there is no indication in sources whether or not this done for Lesbians crew. The master of Lesbian was taken prisoner aboard U-35 by von Arnauld de la Perière. There were no casualties among Lesbians crew in the attack and sinking.

See also

  was a  British cargo ship which was built by Swan, Hunter and Wigham Richardson Ltd, Newcastle upon Tyne in 1923 for Ellerman Lines Ltd. During WWII she was seized in 1940 by the Vichy French forces and later scuttled in 1941.

References

Bibliography 
 
 

 

1915 ships
Ships built on the River Tees
World War I merchant ships of the United Kingdom
Ships of the Ellerman Lines
Ships sunk by German submarines in World War I
World War I shipwrecks in the Mediterranean Sea
Maritime incidents in 1917